Somchai Singmanee (January 20, 1986 ) is a professional footballer from Thailand.

External links
Profile at Thaipremierleague.co.th

1986 births
Living people
Somchai Singmanee
Somchai Singmanee
Association football forwards
Somchai Singmanee
Somchai Singmanee
Somchai Singmanee
Somchai Singmanee
Somchai Singmanee
Somchai Singmanee
Somchai Singmanee